Marian Ionuț Marin (born 11 September 1987) is a Romanian footballer who plays as a central defender for Ozana Târgu Neamț in the Liga III. In his career Marin also played for teams such as: CSM Roman, Dunărea Galați, Petrolul Ploiești, FC Brașov or Academica Clinceni, among others.

References

External links
 

1987 births
Living people
Romanian footballers
Association football defenders
Liga I players
Liga II players
FCM Dunărea Galați players
FC Petrolul Ploiești players
CS Concordia Chiajna players
FC Brașov (1936) players
LPS HD Clinceni players
Sportspeople from Galați